Carl Bode (1911–1993) was an author, poet, professor of English and American Studies at the University of Maryland, and officer of several literary and cultural organizations. He wrote and edited over 30 books, including The American Lyceum, Antebellum Culture, Mencken, the first full biography to be published after H.L. Mencken's death, as well as Maryland, a 350-year history of the state. Bode edited The Collective Poems of Henry Thoreau, The Best of Thoreau's Journals, and The Portable Emerson among others.

He was the founder of the American Studies Association and the Mencken Society, and was president of the Popular Culture Association and the Thoreau Society of America. He was awarded fellowships both by the Guggenheim and Ford Foundations and was named a Fellow of the Royal Society of Literature while serving as cultural attaché at the American Embassy in London. He also taught at the University of Maryland for 40 years.

List of published works

Edited works 

 Collected Poems of Henry Thoreau (1943)
 The Best of Thoreau’s Journals
 co-edited The Correspondence of Henry David Thoreau  
 The Portable Emerson (1981), in collaboration with Malcolm Cowley
The Editor, the Bluenose, and the Prostitute: H.L. Mencken's History of the "Hatrack" Censorship Case. Niwot, Colorado: Roberts, Rinehart, Inc. 1988.

Poetry, biographies, and other written works 

 The American Lyceum 
 Antebellum Culture
 Mencken (1969)
 Maryland: A Bicentennial History (1978)
 The Anatomy of American Popular Culture (1983)
 The Sacred Seasons (1975) 
 Practical Magic (1981)
 The Man Behind You

External links 
 Carl Bode papers at the University of Maryland Libraries 
 The New York Times Carl Bode obituary

References 

1911 births
1993 deaths
American male non-fiction writers
20th-century American male writers
20th-century American non-fiction writers
University of Maryland, College Park faculty